Poropuntius chonglingchungi is a species of ray-finned fish in the genus Poropuntius. The species is only known from Fuxian Lake in Yunnan; it enters streams for spawning. It has been impacted by introduced species, the loss of spawning habitat, and over-fishing. It has not been recorded since the 1980s; IUCN considers it as Critically Endangered and possibly extinct.

References 

chonglingchungi
Endemic fauna of Yunnan
Freshwater fish of China
Taxa named by Tchang Tchung-Lin
Fish described in 1938